Kerteh Football Club (Malay: Kelab Bola Sepak Kerteh), commonly referred to as Kerteh FC and nicknamed The Oilers, is a semi-professional association football club based in Kerteh, Terengganu, Malaysia. Founded in 2018, the club competes in the Terengganu Amateur League (TAL), which is part of the Malaysia M4 League, the fourth tier of the Malaysian football league system.

The Oilers won the Terengganu Amateur League and TAL Cup in their debut season in 2019. Since its inception, Kerteh FC has had a fierce rivalry with Real Chukai FC, another Kemaman-based side. The rivalry between the two clubs has been dubbed the Kemaman Derby by supporters of both clubs.

History

Beginnings 
Kerteh FC was unofficially founded in July 2017 by Syed Khairi Amier Syed Radzuan, Ramzan Ibrahim and Muhamad Badrrol Idris from Kerteh-based non-governmental organisation Gabungan Pemuda-Pemuda Islam (GAPPs), which organised various sports tournaments since 2008.

Inaugural season and progress 

The team was officially formed on 25 September 2018 and competed in its first competitive match on 25 October 2019 in the Terengganu Amateur League. Under Kamal Rodiarjat's stewardship, the club won the league and cup in 2019, becoming the first fourth-division team in Terengganu to do a double and qualified for the 2020 Malaysia FA Cup.

The club made its FA Cup debut against Northern Lions FC in the preliminary stage, losing 2–0 at the Mak Chilli Stadium, Kemaman.

Ownership and finances

KAL Services Sdn. Bhd. 

The holding company of Kerteh Football Club, KAL Services Sdn. Bhd. is a special purpose vehicle (SPV) established to guarantee the financial sustainability and commercial growth of the club. Apart from the business of football, the company engages in other business activities related to the oil and gas, marine and construction industries, with all proceeds from revenues generated going towards the club. On 5 December 2020, the club announced that INKA Creative Agency, a creative agency based in Kuala Lumpur acquired 10% shares of the company.

Financial statements and recognition 

Despite being a fourth-tier team, Kerteh FC is one of the few clubs in Malaysia that release financial statements to the public and is regarded as one of the most profitable football clubs in the country, earning praises from Football Association of Malaysia General Secretary Stuart Michael Ramalingam.

The club recorded 20.9% in profit for the ending year of 2018. In 2019, Kerteh FC's revenue increased by 232.8%. The club also diversified its income sources, mainly through businesses which included oil and gas, soccer schools, match livestreaming, advertising, grassroots leagues, and merchandising.  Despite the COVID-19 pandemic, the club managed to record a profit of 4% for the year ending in 2020.

On 15 June 2020, Kerteh FC received an invitation to join the Malaysia External Trade Development Corporation (MATRADE) to share experiences, opinions and various technical and commercial information on community club development.

Brand and identity

Crest and colours 

After the shares acquisition by INKA Creative, the club underwent a total rebrand and unveiled a new badge. The new logo took a major inspiration from petroleum processing plants in Kerteh and features the initial letter of the club's name and area. It also retained several design elements from the old logo such as a red gemstone, inspired by flames emitted from tall chimneys by the sea, a sight synonymous with the city. The club's branding efforts are widely praised among observer and football fans in Malaysia.

Kits 

Kerteh FC's kit was initially manufactured by Thai sportswear company Pegan Sport in 2018. From the 2021 season onward, the club kits have been produced and sponsored by local sportswear company Vayorken, including for the first team, academy team and Esport team.

The club's official colours are green and white, after initially starting with fluorescent green in 2018. In its first season in the Malaysia League, its home kit was green with white hoops and their away kit was green with dark green stripes. Their alternate uniform is pitch red in colour. In 2020, a special edition jersey was produced due to the year's cancellation of the Malaysia M4 League by Malaysian Football League.

Special edition jersey 
In June 2020, Kerteh FC released a special jersey called 'Kerteh FC Jersey 2020 #StayAtHome Edition' in tribute to the lockdown caused by the COVID-19 pandemic in Malaysia. Each jersey has its own serial number at the bottom left of the jersey. The jersey also has the words 'Perintah Kawalan Pergerakan' with the date '18.3.2020 – 9.6.2020' on the chest in remembrance of the Malaysian movement control order implemented by the government. The number 20 on the back of the jersey symbolises the year of 2020, when the COVID-19 pandemic started in Malaysia. Due to high demand, the jersey was re-released in September 2020 and again in July 2021.

Anthem 

On 4 February 2019, the club released its official anthem titled Kerteh FC (The Oilers) – The City of Light. Written and composed by Azizul Hj Umar, the song was sung by the Malaysian singer .

Stadium 

The club played home matches on different grounds around the Kemaman district since their inception. Following a meeting with Kemaman City Council on 24 June 2020, the club successfully leased the Kertih Mini Stadium to be their home ground for the 2021 season. The lease comes with a piece of 8.49-hectare land surrounding the mini stadium, which the club intends to develop into the Kerteh Sports City that includes other sport facilities. The club has also secured Red Antlers Sdn. Bhd. as an investor for the development project and issued opportunities to potential brand partners interested with the naming rights of the upcoming stadium.

Football development 

Kerteh FC has its own academy and elite development programme as part of its long-term plan to focus on nurturing football talents and helps encourage a healthy lifestyle and drive football participation among the people in Kerteh and Kemaman. Training players from as young as the Under-8 age group, its development programme is prepared by the club's Technical Advisor from Spain, Oscar Riera Alvarez. Besides football training, the players are provided with scholarships by the club and enrolled into the best schools in Kerteh or Kemasik, and opportunities to study in college or university in Kemaman. The club aims to operates several more soccer schools outside of Terengganu by 2026.

Affiliated club 

On 5 September 2020, Barcelona-based Unió Esportiva Sant Andreu announced an official partnership with Kerteh FC, which made the Malaysian club part of the Spanish side's International Association Program. The collaboration allows Kerteh FC academy players to be nurtured by Sant Andreu coaches and provides them with opportunities and benefits to help with their development. The best players from the U-18 squad are sent for trial and training stint, while those missing the chance to go to Spain are absorbed into the Senior B, the feeder team for the main squad.

Grassroots efforts 

Kerteh FC organised the Kemasik Grassroot Cup in 2018 and worked together with partners such as RHB Bank Kerteh in providing training scholarships to underprivileged children with exceptional football talents. The club also established the Kemasik Amateur League in the same year with the purpose of scouting talents within Kerteh and Kemasik. In its inaugural season, eight teams took part in the league competition spanning for approximately six months. Participating teams are provided with grants, courses and programmes to help them with their finances, training and management.

On 4 December 2020, the club was awarded the Bronze Member of FAM SupaRimau Charter, an endorsement tool to support football academies in their roles of implementing grassroots programmes and activities, by Football Association of Malaysia.

Players

First-team squad

Club captain

Management and coaching staff

KAL Services Sdn. Bhd.

Kerteh Football Club

Head coach history

Honours

Domestic

League 

Malaysia M4 League: Terengganu Amateur League
Winners (1):  2019

Cups 

TAL Cup
Winners (1):  2019

Season statistics 

Key:

Pld = Played, W = Won, D = Drawn, L = Lost, F = Goals for, A = Goals against, GD = Goal difference, Pts= Points, Pos = Position

References

External links 
 Kerteh F.C. official Website

Football clubs in Malaysia
Sports clubs in Malaysia
Association football clubs established in 2018
2018 establishments in Malaysia
History of football in Malaysia
Sport in Terengganu